The following is a list of events including expected and scheduled events for the year 2022 in Australia.

Incumbents

Monarch – Elizabeth II (until 8 September), then Charles III
Governor-General – David Hurley
Prime Minister – Scott Morrison (until 23 May), then Anthony Albanese
Deputy Prime Minister – Barnaby Joyce (until 23 May), then Richard Marles
Opposition Leader – Anthony Albanese (until 23 May), then Peter Dutton (from 30 May)
Chief Justice – Susan Kiefel

State and Territory Leaders
Premier of New South Wales – Dominic Perrottet
Opposition Leader – Chris Minns 
Premier of Queensland – Annastacia Palaszczuk
Opposition Leader – David Crisafulli
Premier of South Australia – Steven Marshall (until 21 March), then Peter Malinauskas
Opposition Leader – Peter Malinauskas (until 21 March), then David Speirs (from 19 April)
Premier of Tasmania – Peter Gutwein (until 8 April), then Jeremy Rockliff
Opposition Leader – Rebecca White
Premier of Victoria – Daniel Andrews
Opposition Leader – Matthew Guy (until 8 December), then John Pesutto
Premier of Western Australia – Mark McGowan
Opposition Leader – Mia Davies
Chief Minister of the Australian Capital Territory – Andrew Barr
Opposition Leader – Elizabeth Lee
Chief Minister of the Northern Territory – Michael Gunner (until 13 May), then Natasha Fyles
Opposition Leader – Lia Finocchiaro

Governors and Administrators
Governor of New South Wales – Margaret Beazley
Governor of Queensland – Jeannette Young
Governor of South Australia – Frances Adamson 
Governor of Tasmania – Barbara Baker
Governor of Victoria – Linda Dessau
Governor of Western Australia – Kim Beazley (until 15 July), then Chris Dawson
Administrator of the Australian Indian Ocean Territories – Natasha Griggs
Administrator of Norfolk Island – Eric Hutchinson
Administrator of the Northern Territory – Vicki O'Halloran

Events

January
 6 January – Tennis player Novak Djokovic has his visa cancelled for failing to present evidence of COVID-19 vaccination upon arrival in Melbourne to compete in the 2022 Australian Open. Djokovic is placed in immigration detention pending deportation, and indicates he will commence legal action against the decision.
 13 January – Official deaths from COVID-19 surpass 2,500.
 14 January – After Novak Djokovic's visa is re-instated by a judge of the Federal Circuit Court on 10 January, immigration minister Alex Hawke uses the ministerial discretion provisions of the Migration Act 1958 to re-cancel Djokovic's visa, citing "health and good order grounds".
 17–30 January – The Australian Open 2022 is held. Ashleigh Barty wins the women's singles title, the first Australian to do so since 1978. Spanish player Rafael Nadal wins the men's singles title.

February
 5 February – Convoy to Canberra: About 2,000 Anti-vaccination mandate protestors marched to the Parliamentary Triangle. The march began at Glebe Park in the CBD, then onto Commonwealth Avenue, disrupting traffic. United Australia Party leader Craig Kelly and Liberal National Party of Queensland Member of Parliament George Christensen and Senator Gerard Rennick attended the protests.
 6 February – Platinum Jubilee of Elizabeth II's accession as Queen of Australia. Buildings and monuments across Australia were lit in royal purple to mark the start of the Platinum Jubilee year.
 12 February – 
 Convoy to Canberra: Around 10,000 Anti-vaccination mandate protesters converged on Parliament House and Old Parliament House. These protesters had camped at Exhibition Park in Canberra (EPIC), after being moved on from the lawns next to the National Library. Police arrested three people including one man for breaching a fence while two others were arrested for disturbing the peace. The crowd was generally well behaved. Participants called for the elimination of mandates and the sacking of government ministers. In response, Police called on protesters to vacate by 13 February.
 The Māori All Stars defeat the Indigenous All Stars 16–10 in the 2022 All Stars match, held at CommBank Stadium. Māori prop Joseph Tapine, of Canberra Raiders, wins the Preston Campbell medal for Man of the Match.
 The Indigenous Women's All Stars defeat the Māori Women's All Stars 18–8 in the 2022 Women's All Stars match. Indigenous winger Jaime Chapman is named Player of the Match.
 21 February – Australia's external border to reopen to all fully vaccinated non-citizens and non-residents, the border has been closed since 20 March 2020.
 26 February – Flooding in Queensland kills 2 more people, with the death toll rising to 4. An SES Volunteer is among the dead.
 27 February – The flood crisis in New South Wales and Queensland continues with the death toll in Queensland increasing to 6. Floodwaters in Northern New South Wales are feared to be higher than 2017. The Mary River in Gympie peaked at 22.8m, the highest peak since 1893.
 28 February – The flooding emergency continues into New South Wales, with Lismore, New South Wales experiencing its worst flood in history. The Wilsons River surpassed the previous highest flood peaks in 1954 and 1974.

March
 10 March – The 2022 NRL season commences, with 2021 premiers Penrith Panthers defeating Manly-Warringah Sea Eagles 28–6 at BlueBet Stadium.
 19 March – The 2022 South Australian state election results in defeat for Steven Marshall's Liberal government, and Labor leader Peter Malinauskas claims victory. Pauline Hanson's One Nation Sarah Game won a seat within the South Australia legislative council (upper house) making history as One Nation first member of SA parliament.
 25 March – Lance Franklin kicks his 1000th AFL goal against the Geelong Cats at the SCG.
 27 March – A-League Women Grand Final is held at Jubilee Oval, Sydney with Melbourne Victory defeating Sydney FC 2–1. Melbourne Victory's Casey Dumont was named Player of the Match.
 29 March –  the Supreme Court of NSW dissolved the Christian Democratic Party, a party that had at least one member in that state's Legislative Council, often holding or sharing the balance of power since 1981.

April
 7 April – Queensland Liberal National MP George Christensen leaves the LNP, just days before the election was called, claiming that it was not conservative enough. A few days later Christensen announced he had joined Pauline Hanson's One Nation.
 8 April – Jeremy Rockliff becomes Premier of Tasmania after Peter Gutwein's resignation.
 9 April – AFL Women's Grand Final is held at Adelaide Oval, with  defeating  4.5 (29) – 2.4 (16). Adelaide's Anne Hatchard was named best on ground.
 10 April – Sydney Roosters defeat St. George Illawarra Dragons 16–4 to win the Grand Final of the delayed 2021 NRL Women's season at Moreton Daily Stadium. Roosters second-rower Sarah Togatuki is awarded the Karyn Murphy Medal for player of the match.

April–May election campaign
10 April: Scott Morrison announces the date of the 2022 Australian federal election as 21 May.
11 April: Labor Opposition Leader Anthony Albanese was unable to state the cash or unemployment rates.
13 April: Labor said they would not commit to an increase in JobSeeker Payment after the election if they win.
16 April: 
 Albanese said he would commit to an anti-corruption watchdog should Labor win the election.
 The United Australia Party election campaign launch was held.
19 April: A debate was held at the National Press Club in Canberra between Minister for Agriculture and Northern Australia David Littleproud and Shadow Minister Julie Collins.
20 April: 
 Morrison continued to support his "captain's pick" to contest the seat of Warringah, Katherine Deves, despite her comments about transgender people and surrogacy.
 First leaders' debate in Brisbane took place in front of 100 undecided voters, with Albanese declared the winner, with 40 votes to Morrison's 35 and 25 still undecided.
21 April: Albanese tested positive for COVID-19 and was unable to campaign in person for seven days.
22 April: Former Liberal foreign minister Julie Bishop and former defence chief Chris Barrie criticised the Morrison government for not doing enough to stop the Solomon Islands' security pact with China.
29 April: Albanese came out of COVID-19 isolation.
30 April: Shadow minister Bill Shorten said Labor would hold a royal commission into Robodebt if elected.
1 May: The Labor election campaign launch was held in Perth.
4 May: A debate was held at the National Press Club in Canberra between Treasurer Josh Frydenberg and Shadow Treasurer Jim Chalmers.
5 May: 
Pauline Hanson's One Nation party was criticised for running "ghost candidates" in several electorates, who are neither campaigning in the lead-up to the election nor have an online presence. Additionally, many do not live in the electorates they are contesting. One Nation committed to run candidates in all seats.
A debate was held at the National Press Club in Canberra between Minister for Defence Peter Dutton and Shadow Minister Brendan O'Connor.
8 May: Second leaders' debate took place in Sydney.
11 May:
Albanese said that he supported an increase of 5.1% to the minimum wage or an additional $1 an hour, tied to the inflation rate, with criticism from Morrison claiming that it would result in increasing interest rates.
Third leaders' debate took place in Sydney.
13 May: A debate was held at the National Press Club in Canberra between Minister for Foreign Affairs Marise Payne and Shadow Minister Penny Wong.
15 May: The Liberal election campaign launch was held in Brisbane, six days before the election, where Morrison promised to allow people to purchase their first home using funds from their superannuation.
18 May:
Albanese addressed the National Press Club. Morrison is the first prime minister since 1969 not to address the National Press Club in the final week of an election campaign.
The Australian Bureau of Statistics released the March 2022 Quarter Wage Price Index of 0.7%, or 2.4% annually.
20 May: Telephone voting rules changed to allow Australians who have tested positive to COVID-19 after 6 pm on 13 May to vote by telephone.
21 May: The 2022 Australian federal election takes place. 
 Morrison advised in a press conference that a boat with refugees from Sri Lanka had been intercepted and turned back by the Australian Border Force. Hours before polling stations close, voters across the country received a text message about the boat turnback, urging them to vote Liberal for border security. The ABC later revealed on 27 May that the act followed a direct request from the Prime Minister's Office to the Border Force in revealing the operation before it was completed.
Anthony Albanese defeated Scott Morrison in the election and brought Labor back into government for the first time since 2013.
Morrison conceded defeat and resigned as leader of the Liberal Party; his successor will be decided at the next  Liberal party room meeting.

May
 9 May – The Australian Building Codes Board released Volume 1 of NCC2022.
 23 May – Anthony Albanese is sworn in as the 31st prime minister of Australia, becoming the first Italian Australian to hold the office.
 28 May – A-League Men Grand Final is held at  AAMI Park, Melbourne with Western United defeating Melbourne City 2–0. Western United's Aleksandar Prijović was named Player of the Match.
 30 May – Peter Dutton is elected unopposed as Leader of the Liberal Party and Sussan Ley is elected unopposed as deputy leader. Both becoming Leader and Deputy leader of the Opposition respectively.

June
 8 June – Queensland defeat New South Wales 16–10 in the first match of the 2022 State of Origin series, held at Accor Stadium. Queensland five-eighth Cameron Munster is named player of the match. The match is notable for housing the highest attendance for a rugby league event since the COVID-19 pandemic's onset two years prior, with 80,512 people attending.
 24 June – New South Wales defeat Queensland 20–14 in the 2022 Women's State of Origin match at GIO Stadium. NSW centre Isabelle Kelly is awarded the Nellie Doherty medal for player of the match.
 26 June – New South Wales defeat Queensland 44–12 in the second match of the 2022 State of Origin series, held at Optus Stadium. NSW halfback Nathan Cleary is named player of the match.

July
 3 July – Floods ravage New South Wales, with Camden flooding for the fourth time in one year.
 6-7 July – Taree records 305mm of rain in 24 hours, a total not seen since official records began in 1881.
 13 July – Queensland defeat New South Wales 22–12 in the third match of the 2022 State of Origin series, held at Suncorp Stadium, clinching the series for the team's 23rd overall title. Queensland fullback Kalyn Ponga is named player of the match, while lock Patrick Carrigan is named player of the series.
 17 July – 2022 outstation murder-suicide.

August
 16 August – The Anglican Church of Australia splits: Conservatives form an Australian breakaway church Diocese of the Southern Cross. It is to be led by former Archbishop of Sydney Glenn Davies. The split was caused by the differing positions on same sex marriage among other issues.

September
 4 September – Penrith Panthers win the minor premiership following the final main round of the 2022 NRL season. Wests Tigers finish in last position, claiming the wooden spoon - their first as a joint-venture club and their first overall since the Western Suburbs Magpies' 1999 season.
 8 September – Queen Elizabeth II dies. She is succeeded by her son, King Charles III.
 11 September – Charles III is proclaimed as King of Australia by Governor-General David Hurley at Parliament House.
 19 September – Australian representatives attend the funeral of Queen Elizabeth II in London.
 22 September – A national day of mourning occurs in Australia for the late Queen Elizabeth II with a public holiday and a National Memorial Service at Parliament House in Canberra.
 22 September – Optus advises at least ten million current and former  customers personal details are accessed in a cyber attack.
 24 September – The Geelong Cats defeat the Sydney Swans to win the 2022 AFL Grand Final.

October
 2 October – The Penrith Panthers defeat the Parramatta Eels 28–12 to win the 2022 NRL Grand Final at Accor Stadium, becoming the second team in the NRL era to win back-to-back premierships. Panthers fullback Dylan Edwards is awarded the Clive Churchill medal for man of the match. Pre-match entertainment is headlined by Jimmy Barnes and Bliss n Eso.
 Newcastle Knights defeat Parramatta Eels 32–13 to win the Grand Final of the 2022 NRL Women's season at Accor Stadium. Knights fullback Tamika Upton is awarded the Karyn Murphy medal for player of the match.
 13 October – Ongoing torrential rains cause flooding in Victoria, Tasmania and New South Wales.

November
 23 November – The home of prominent YouTube star Jordan Shanks is firebombed. Shanks himself is unharmed.
 26 November – The 2022 Victorian state election is held.
 28 November – The National Party of Australia comes out as being opposed to the Voice to Parliament, becoming the first major party against it.

December
 12 December – the Wieambilla police shootings a mass shooting at a rural property in Wieambilla, a locality in Queensland, Australia.
 14–20 December – Thomas Sewell leader of the European Australia Movement and Far Right Lads Society contested charges of affray, recklessly causing injury, and unlawful assault in the Melbourne Magistrates Court. He attended with a number of supporters, including Blair Cottrell. Other supporters, including Neil Erikson, watched the proceedings online. The following week, Sewell was found guilty affray and recklessly causing injury.
 16 December – the Labor Albanese government announced that it will abolish the Administrative Appeals Tribunal AAT and replace it with a new body.

Deaths

January

 1 January – Sir Victor Garland, Western Australian politician and diplomat (b. 1934)
 3 January – Ulysses Kokkinos, soccer player and manager (born in Turkey) (b. 1949)
 4 January
 Leanne Armand, marine scientist (b. 1968)
 Percy Hobson, high jumper (b. 1942)
 Kevin Kalkhoven, venture capitalist and auto racing magnate (died in the United States) (b. 1944)
 Craig Ruddy, artist (b. 1968).
 5 January – Keith Goullet, Australian rules footballer (North Melbourne) (b. 1932)
 6 January – Miranda Fryer, actress (b. 1987)
 7 January – Marc Dé Hugar, guitarist (b. 1969)
 8 January
 Bill Cornish, legal scholar and academic (died in the United Kingdom) (b. 1937)
 Mike Gore, physicist (born in the United Kingdom) (b. 1934)
 Marc Wilkinson, composer and conductor (born in France) (b. 1929)
 9 January
 Harley Balic, Australian rules footballer (Fremantle) (b. 1997)
 Derek Goldby, theatre director (b. 1940)
 Bob Shearer, golfer and golf course architect (b. 1948)
 10 January
 Garry Bradbury, musician (born in the United Kingdom) (b. 1960)
 Gerald Tanner, Australian rules footballer (Richmond) (b. 1921)
 12 January
 Colin Harburn, cricketer (b. 1938)
 Geoff Wilson, Australian rules footballer (Hawthorn) (b. 1940)
 13 January – Troy Pickard, Western Australian politician (b. 1973)
 15 January 
 Scot Palmer, sports journalist (b. 1937)
 Hossein Valamanesh, contemporary artist (born in Iran) (b. 1949)
 16 January – Jill Robb, film producer (born in the United Kingdom) (b. 1934)
 17 January
 Dean Jaensch, political scientist (b. 1936)
 Stan Neilly, New South Wales politician (b. 1942)
 19 January – Kenneth Norman Jones, public servant (b. 1924)
 20 January – Ron Grey, senior army officer and commissioner of the Australian Federal Police (b. 1930)
 21 January – Fred Moore, miner and trade unionist (b. 1922)
 22 January
 Denise Allen, Victorian politician (b. 1953)
 Judy Banks, television presenter and actress (b. 1935)
 Craig McGregor, journalist (b. 1933)
 Baillieu Myer, businessman and philanthropist (born in the United States) (b. 1926)
 Michael Thornhill, film director, producer and screenwriter (b. 1941)
 26 January
 Rosalie Kunoth-Monks, actress and Aboriginal activist (b. 1937)
 Janet Mead, Catholic nun and singer (b. 1937)
 30 January
 Michael Beahan, Western Australian politician (born in the United Kingdom) (b. 1937)
 Graham Campbell, Australian rules footballer (Fitzroy) (b. 1936)

February 

 1 February
 Fred Cook, Australian rules footballer (Footscray) (b. 1947)
 Glenn Wheatley, musician and manager (b. 1948)
 2 February – Laurie Mithen, Australian rules footballer (Melbourne) (b. 1934)
 3 February – Joseph Hitti, Maronite Catholic eparch (born in Lebanon) (b. 1925)
 5 February – John Bryson, author and lawyer (b. 1935)
 7 February – Noel Allanson, cricketer and Australian rules footballer (Essendon) (b. 1925)
 9 February – Johnny Raper, rugby league footballer and coach (b. 1939)
 11 February – Ken Turner, Australian rules footballer (Collingwood) (b. 1935)
 12 February – Mark Shulman, rugby league footballer (b. 1951)
 14 February 
 Joan Croll, physician and radiologist (b. 1928)
 Mary Willey, Tasmanian politician (b. 1941)
 17 February 
 Jack Bendat, businessman (born in the United States) (b. 1925)
 Nigel Berlyn, rear admiral (born in the United Kingdom) (b. 1934)
 19 February – Nigel Butterley, composer and pianist (b. 1935)
 20 February – John Bonney, Australian rules footballer (St Kilda) (b. 1946)
 21 February – Neil Balnaves, film producer and philanthropist (b. 1944)
 24 February – John Landy, 26th Governor of Victoria and Olympic athlete (b. 1930)
 25 February – Lorna Fejo, member of the stolen generations (b. 1930)
 26 February
 Moss Cass, Victorian politician (b. 1927)
 Ingo Renner, glider pilot (born in Germany) (b. 1940)

March 

 1 March – Jordie Albiston, poet (b. 1961)
 3 March – Dean Woods, Olympic cyclist (b. 1966) 
 4 March
 Elsa Klensch, journalist and television presenter (died in the United States) (b. 1930)
 Rod Marsh, cricketer (b. 1947)
 Shane Warne, cricketer (died in Thailand) (b. 1969)
 10 March 
 Ian Hannaford, Australian rules footballer (Port Adelaide) (b. 1940)
 Kimberley Kitching, Victorian politician (b. 1970)
 13 March – Peter McMahon, New South Wales politician (b. 1931)
 14 March – Jason Edwards, rugby league footballer (b. 1969)
 16 March – Graham McColl, Australian rules footballer (Carlton) (b. 1934)
 19 March
 Alan Hopgood, actor, producer and writer (b. 1934)
 Bruce Rigsby, anthropologist (born in the United States) (b. 1937)
 22 March – Zipping, racehorse (b. 2001)
 23 March – Max Walsh, journalist (b. 1937)
 24 March – John Andrews, architect (b. 1933)
 26 March – Tom Reynolds, Victorian politician (b. 1936)
 30 March
 Bob Brown, New South Wales politician (b. 1933)
 Ernie Carroll, puppeteer (b. 1929)
 David Irvine, 10th Director-General of ASIS and 12th Director-General of Security (b. 1947)

April

 1 April – Daphne Pirie, athlete and sports administrator (b. 1931)
 3 April – James Webster, Victorian politician (b. 1925)
 7 April
 John Jobling, New South Wales politician (b. 1937)
 Ken West, music promoter (b. 1958)
 9 April
 Chris Bailey, rock singer and musician (born in Kenya) (b. 1957)
 Inga Freidenfelds, basketballer (born in Latvia) (b. 1935)
 Allan Trusler, Australian rules footballer (Footscray) (b. 1933)
 11 April – Bill Ludwig, trade unionist (b. 1934)
 14 April
 Irving Davidson, Australian rules footballer (St Kilda) (b. 1929)
 Chic Henry, car enthusiast, founder of Summernats (b. 1946)
 15 April
 Tony Brown, rugby league player (b. 1936)
 Jack Newton, golfer (b. 1950)
 18 April – Noel Alford, Australian rules footballer (North Melbourne) (b. 1932)
 19 April – Sandra Pisani, Olympic field hockey player (b. 1959)
 21 April – John Rutherford, cricketer (b. 1929)
 24 April – Kathy Mills, community leader and activist (b. 1936)
 26 April – Peter Vickery, judge (b. 1950)
 30 April – Max Riebl, countertenor (b. 1991)

May 

 4 May
 Richard Connolly, composer and ABC broadcaster (b. 1927)
 Wukun Wanambi, painter, filmmaker and curator (b. 1962)
 5 May – Arthur Tonkin, politician (born 1930)
 7 May – Bob Barnard, jazz musician (b. 1933)
 9 May – John Henry Coates, mathematician (died in United Kingdom) (b. 1945)
 10 May – Jock O'Brien, Australian rules footballer (b. 1937)
 11 May – John Cripps, horticulturalist (born in United Kingdom) (b. 1927)
 12 May
 Ruth Bishop, virologist (b. 1933)
 Djalu Gurruwiwi, musician (b. )
 14 May – Andrew Symonds, cricketer (b. 1975)
 15 May
 Frank Curry, rugby league player and coach (South Sydney) (b. 1950)
 Ken Mulhall, Australian rules footballer (b. 1927)
 20 May – Caroline Jones, television journalist (b. 1938)
 27 May – Jim Wallis, Australian rules footballer (b. 1941)
 29 May – Gary Winram, olympic swimmer (b. 1936)
 30 May – Vincent Ryan, Catholic priest and convicted sex offender (b. 1938)

June 

 1 June
 Sir Gerard Brennan, 10th Chief Justice of Australia (b. 1928)
 John Lloyd, Australian rules footballer (Carlton) (b. 1945)
 3 June – Roger Scholes, director, writer and cinematographer (b. 1950)
 4 June – Robert Laurie, rugby league footballer (b. 1956)
 6 June – Helen Hodgman, novelist (born in the United Kingdom) (b. 1945)
 7 June
 Anne Cutler, psycholinguist (died in The Netherlands) (b. 1945)
 Tommy Dysart, actor (born in the United Kingdom) (b. 1936)
 8 June – Clive Doyle, Branch Davidian (died in the United States) (b. 1941)
 13 June – John Rigby, Olympic swimmer (b. 1942)
 16 June – Tony Boskovic, soccer referee (born in Yugoslavia) (b. 1933)
 17 June
 John Mountford, New South Wales politician (b. 1933)
 Malcolm Skilbeck, educator (b. 1932)
 19 June
 Ken Fyffe, Australian rules footballer (North Melbourne) (b. 1938)
 Carol Raye, actress (born in the United Kingdom) (b. 1923)
 21 June – Sir Peter Barter, Papua New Guinean businessman and politician (b. 1940)
 23 June – Paula Stafford, fashion designer (b. 1920)
 24 June – Neil Chandler, Australian rules footballer (Carlton, St Kilda) (b. 1949)
 26 June – Frank Moorhouse, writer (b. 1938)
 28 June – Neville Hayes, Olympic swimmer (b. 1943)
 29 June – Neil Kerley, Australian rules footballer (b. 1934)
 30 June – Brian Tomlinson, Australian rules footballer (South Melbourne) (b. 1940)

July 

 1 July
 Eddie Brooks, water polo player (b. 1950)
 Bob King, lawn bowler (b. 1934)
 2 July – Jane Garrett, Victorian politician (b. 1973)
 5 July – Elizabeth Grant, anthropologist (b. 1963)
 6 July – Tricia, Asian elephant (born in South Vietnam) (b. 1957)
 8 July
 Robin Dalton, literary agent, film producer and memoirist (b. 1920)
 Paul Dear, Australian rules footballer (Hawthorn) (b. 1966)
 Beth Gott, plant physiologist (b. 1922)
 10 July – Noel McMahen, Australian rules footballer (Melbourne) (b. 1926)
 11 July – Shirley Cotton, discus thrower (b. 1934)
 13 July – Colin Stubs, tennis player and promoter (b. 1941)
 15 July – Terry Fulton, Australian rules footballer (Geelong) (b. 1930)
 16 July – Sean Quilty, long-distance runner (b. 1966)
 18 July – Tony Ongarello, Australian rules footballer (Fitzroy) (b. 1932)
 19 July – Steve Gibbons, Victorian politician (b. 1949)
 20 July – Stephen Milosz, cricketer (b. 1955)
 21 July – Justin Crawford, Australian rules footballer (Sydney, Hawthorn)  (b. 1977)
 22 July – Frankie Davidson, singer and actress (b. 1934)
 23 July
 Con Britt, Australian rules footballer (Collingwood)  (b. 1947)
 Billy Picken, Australian rules footballer (Collingwood, Sydney)  (b. 1956)
 25 July – Bruce Williams, Australian rules footballer (Carlton) (b. 1939)
 26 July
 David Ireland, novelist (b. 1927)
 William Phillips, water polo player (b. 1943)
 Laurie Sawle, cricket player and administrator (b. 1925)
 27 July
 John Gayler, Queensland politician (b. 1943)
 Edwin Wilson, poet, painter and scientist (b. 1942)
 29 July
 Phil Carlson, cricketer (b. 1951)
 Arthur Malcolm, Anglican prelate (b. 1934)
 30 July – Archie Roach, musician (b. 1956)
 31 July
 Terry Davies, rower (born in the British Raj) (b. 1933)
 Herb Henderson, Australian rules footballer (Footscray) (b. 1930)

August

 1 August – Paul Eenhoorn, actor (died in the United States) (b. 1948)
 3 August
 Shirley Barrett, film director (b. 1961)
 Bruce Grant, writer and journalist (b. 1925)
 Evan Jones, poet (b. 1931)
 4 August – Johnny Famechon, boxer (born in France) (b. 1945)
 5 August
 Judith Durham, singer (b. 1943)
 Bob Lay, athlete (b. 1944)
 John Tingle, New South Wales politician and journalist (b. 1931)
 7 August
 Noel Clarke, Australian rules footballer (Melbourne) (b. 1930)
 Judy Gamin, Queensland politician (b. 1930)
 8 August – Dame Olivia Newton-John, singer, actress and activist (born in the United Kingdom and died in the United States) (b. 1948)
 9 August
 Bernie Crowe, Australian rules footballer (Geelong) (b. 1932)
 Ian McCausland, artist (b. 1944)
 11 August
 Bill Blevin, physician (b. 1929)
 Arthur Goddard, engineer (born in the United Kingdom) (b. 1921)
 Paul Green, rugby league footballer and coach (b. 1972)
 12 August
 Lillian Frank, hairdresser, philanthropist, and fashion influencer (born in Burma) (b. 1930)
 Keith Jamieson, country singer (b. 1948)
 Virginia Spate, art historian (born in the United Kingdom) (b. 1937)
 14 August – Marshall Napier, actor (born in New Zealand) (b. 1951)
 16 August – Peter Lloyd, aviator and entrepreneur (b. 1920)
 17 August
 Arthur Pound, Australian rules footballer (Melbourne) (b. 1930)
 Sir David Smith, public servant and Official Secretary to the Governor-General (b. 1933)
 21 August
 Vincent Gil, actor (b. 1939)
 Peter Stone, soccer player (b. 1954)
 23 August
 Barbara Cunningham, gymnast (b. 1926)
 William Doe, gastroenterologist (b. 1941)
 26 August
 Dame Valerie Beral, epidemiologist (died in the United Kingdom) (b. 1946)
 Jim Lenehan, rugby union player (b. 1938)
 Sue Wills, academic and activist (b. 1944)
 28 August – Ken Van Heekeren, rugby league footballer (b. unknown)
 29 August – Craig Powell, poet and psychoanalyst (b. 1940)
 31 August – Allan Hawke, public servant and diplomat (b. 1948)

September 

 2 September 
 Peter Eckersley, computer scientist and cyber security activist (died in the United States) (b. 1979)
 Barry Muir, rugby league player and coach (b. 1937)
 5 September – Shirley McKechnie, dancer and choreographer (b. 1926)
 8 September 
 Elizabeth II, Queen of Australia (b. 1926)
 Bobby Keyes, rugby league player (b. 1939)
 10 September – Mario Bortolotto, Australian rules footballer (Geelong, Carlton) (b. 1957)
 13 September – Jack Charles, actor and Aboriginal elder (b. 1943)
 16 September – Allen Aylett, Australian rules footballer (North Melbourne) and administrator (b. 1934)
 17 September
 Jim Frazier, inventor, naturalist and cinematographer (b. 1940)
 Mal Logan, geographer and university administrator (b. 1931)
 20 September – Peter Yeldham, screenwriter, playwright and novelist (b. 1927)
 21 September – John Hamblin, actor and television presenter (born in the United Kingdom) (b. 1935)
 22 September – Raymond Jones, architect and Australian rules footballer (Collingwood, Melbourne) (b. 1925)
 24 September  – Chris Davidson, surfer (b. 1976)
 28 September – Hilton Deakin, Roman Catholic bishop (b. 1932)

October 

 1 October – Paul Harriss, Tasmanian politician (b. 1954)
 5 October – Michael Papps, sport shooter (b. 1932)
 8 October – Angus Trumble, art curator and historian (b. 1964)
 9 October – Margie Masters, golfer (died in the United States) (b. 1934)
 10 October – Allan Wood, Olympic swimmer (b. 1943)
 13 October – John Spender, New South Wales politician, diplomat and barrister (b. 1935)
 16 October – Margaret Sumner, lawn bowler (b. 1941)
 17 October – Dame Carmen Callil, publisher, writer and critic (died in the United Kingdom) (b. 1938)
 20 October – Travis Basevi, cricket statistician and historian (b. 1975)
 21 October – Harry White, jockey (b. 1944)
 22 October – Maurice Rich, athlete (b. 1932)
 25 October – Tony Street, Victorian politician (b. 1926)
 29 October – Sir Peter Morris, surgeon (b. 1934)
 31 October
 Bob Ellicott, New South Wales politician and judge (b. 1927)
 Alan Thomson, cricketer (b. 1945)

November 

 2 November – Nicholas Harding, artist (born in the United Kingdom) (b. 1956)
 4 November – Mel Leckie, Paralympic cyclist (b. 1984)
 7 November – Graeme Anderson, Australian rules footballer (Carlton) (b. 1994)
 8 November 
 Robert Evans, astronomer and Uniting Church minister (b. 1937)
 Peter Reith, Victorian politician (b. 1950)
 10 November – Frank Prihoda, alpine skier (born in Czechoslovakia) (b. 1921)
 13 November – Heather Anderson, Australian rules footballer (Adelaide) (b. 1994)
 15 November – Alison Megarrity, New South Wales politician (b. 1961)
 18 November
 Derek Denton, biochemist (b. 1924)
 Sever Sternhell, organic chemist (born in Poland) (b. 1930)
 24 November – Margaret Hamilton, publisher and writer (b. 1941)
 25 November
 Billy Gordon, Queensland politician (b. 1973)
 Beryl Kimber, violinist and educator (b. 1928)
 26 November – Chris Mitchell, Australian rules footballer (Geelong) (b. 1947)
 27 November – James Wright, medical doctor and media personality (b. 1927)
 28 November
 Jean Calder, humanitarian doctor (died in Palestine) (b. 1932/33)
 Jim Cody, rugby league player (b. 1943)
 Sandy Dawson, barrister (b. 1972)
 30 November – Anne Green, swimming coach (b. 1951)

December 

 2 December
Carolyn Grace, pilot
Jill Jolliffe, journalist (b. 1945)
 3 December – Antigone Kefala, poet (born in Romania) (b. 1935)
 12 December – Alexander Floyd, botanist (b. 1926)
 16 December – Robert Adamson, poet (b. 1943)
 17 December – Lawrence Costa, Northern Territory politician
 21 December – Tony Barry, actor (b. 1941)
 24 December – Barry Round, Australian rules footballer (b. 1950)
 28 December – Joan Sydney, actress (born in England) (b. 1936)
 31 December – Cary Young, quiz champion (born in New Zealand) (b. 1939)

Public holidays

See also

Country overviews
 2020s in Australia political history
 History of Australia
 History of modern Australia
 Outline of Australia
 Government of Australia
 Politics of Australia
 Years in Australia
 Timeline of Australia history
 2022 in Australian literature
 2022 in Australian television
 List of Australian films of 2022

Notes

References

External links

 Online calendar

 
Australia
Australia
2020s in Australia
Years of the 21st century in Australia